Thynstenopera is a genus of trematodes in the family Opecoelidae. It consists of one species, Thynstenopera lobata Bilqees & Khatoon, 2004.

References

Opecoelidae
Plagiorchiida genera
Monotypic protostome genera